Donald Vernon Carlson (March 22, 1919 – October 16, 2004) was an American professional basketball player. He was born in Minneapolis, Minnesota.

A 6'0" (1.83 m) guard/forward from the University of Minnesota, Carlson played four seasons (1946–1947; 1948–1951) in the Basketball Association of America/National Basketball Association as a member of the Chicago Stags, Minneapolis Lakers, and Baltimore Bullets.  He averaged 8.0 points per game in his NBA career and won two championships with the Lakers. He also played one season in the National Basketball League. After his playing days, he was a coach and athletic director at Columbia Heights High School in Columbia Heights, Minnesota.

Carlson died in 2004.

BAA/NBA career statistics

Regular season

Playoffs

References

External links

1919 births
2004 deaths
Baltimore Bullets (1944–1954) players
Basketball players from Minneapolis
Chicago Stags players
Minnesota Golden Gophers men's basketball players
Minneapolis Lakers players
Small forwards
Shooting guards
People from Columbia Heights, Minnesota
American men's basketball players
Edison High School (Minnesota) alumni